Birger Sörvik (4 December 1879 – 23 May 1978) was a Swedish gymnast  who competed in the 1908 Summer Olympics. Together with his brother Haakon he was part of the Swedish team that won the all-around gold medal. His another brother Leif competed in rowing at the 1912 Games.

References

1879 births
1978 deaths
Swedish male artistic gymnasts
Gymnasts at the 1908 Summer Olympics
Olympic gymnasts of Sweden
Olympic gold medalists for Sweden
Olympic medalists in gymnastics
Medalists at the 1908 Summer Olympics
Sportspeople from Gothenburg